Sean McGrath is a musician and artist who lives in San Francisco, California. He is the founding member, guitarist, and vocalist of the death metal band, Impaled, the vocalist of Engorged, and the guitarist and vocalist of Ghoul. He has also created artwork for a number of heavy metal and punk bands, most notably Municipal Waste and The Black Dahlia Murder.

Discography

Demos
Aceldama - "Untitled Cassette Demo", 1994
Inhumation - Medicolegal Investigations of Death (Demo Cassette), 1995
Impaled - Septic Vomit (Demo Cassette), 1997
Impaled - Untitled (Demo Cassette), 1998
Impaled - From Here to Colostomy (Demo Cassette), 1999
Ghoul - Self Titled (Demo Cassette), 2003
The Death of Everything - "Self Titled" (Demo), 2006

Albums
Impaled - The Dead Shall Dead Remain (CD), 2000 Necropolis Records
Impaled - Mondo Medicale (CD), 2002 Necropolis Records
Impaled - Death After Life (CD), 2005 Century Media Records
Impaled - The Last Gasp (CD), 2007 Willowtip Records
Ghoul - We Came for the Dead!!! (CD), 2003 Razorback Records
Ghoul - Maniaxe (CD), 2004 Razorback Records
Ghoul - Splatterthrash (CD), 2006–2007 Razorback Records - re-released on Nerve Damage Records / (Vinyl LP), 2007 Tankcrimes Records
Ghoul - Transmission Zero (Vinyl LP/CD), 2012 Tankcrimes Records

EPs
Impaled - Choice Cuts (Extended Play CD), 2001 Necropolis Records
Impaled - Medical Waste (EP CD), 2002 Necropolis Records
Black Ops - "Pain is Weakness Leaving the Body" (7" Split)
Ghoul - Intermediate Level Hard-Core (Vinyl EP), 2013 Clearview Records / (CD EP), 2013 Tankcrimes Records

Videos
Impaled - "Operating Theatre"
Impaled - "Choke On It"
Impaled - "Preservation of Death"

Guest appearances
Exhumed - Slaughtercult (guest vocals)
Frightmare - Bringing Back the Bloodshed (guest vocals)
Morbosidad - Cagada de Christo (guest vocals)
Scolex - Guest live musician 2011 (guitars)

References

American heavy metal musicians
Year of birth missing (living people)
Living people
Musicians from Oakland, California
Place of birth missing (living people)